Saint-Brice is a commune in the Charente department in southwestern France. It is named after Saint Brice of Tours.

Population

Personalities
Kilian Hennessy - Patriarch of the Hennessy cognac house

Twin towns
 Radda in Chianti, Italy

See also
Communes of the Charente department

References

Communes of Charente
Charente communes articles needing translation from French Wikipedia